This is a list of anime and tokusatsu programs broadcast on the defunct Filipino television channel Hero. All television programs listed below are dubbed in Filipino as the channel was only broadcast in the Philippines.

The list excludes anime films and OVAs shown in Hero's weekend anime movie block, Theatrixx.

Each anime is listed with its most notable/original title with the channel's designation, year of airing and other notes in the parentheses.

Final Programming
The final programming list as of January 31, 2018.

*: First Philippine airing on the channel

 Chaika - The Coffin Princess*
 Naruto: Shippuden (Season 8)
 Himouto! Umaru-chan* (as Umaru-chan)
 Log Horizon* 
 All Out!!*
 Food Wars: Shokugeki no Soma*
 Anohana: The Flower We Saw That Day* (as "Anohana")
 Bodacious Space Pirates*
 Fantasista Doll*
 Love Live! School Idol Project* (Season 2)
 Ultimate Otaku Teacher*
 Kuroko's Basketball (Season 3)
 Yu-Gi-Oh! Arc-V* (first season only)

Other Titles
+: First aired on different channel in the Philippines and dubbed in English

 91 Days* 
 Active Raid*
 Ah! My Goddess (TV series)
 Akame ga Kill!* 
 Akazukin Cha Cha
 Angelic Layer 
 AniMYX
 Anti-Magic Academy: The 35th Test Platoon* 
 The Asterisk War*
 Ao Haru Ride*
 Bodacious Space Pirates*
 Aquarion* and Aquarion Evol*
 Arakawa Under the Bridge*
 Astroboy (both the 1980+ and 2003 versions; the latter is labelled the "US version" because the US-edited version was aired)
 Atashin'chi*
 Babel II*
 Bakegyamon*
 Baki the Grappler Bakugan Battle Brawlers+ and New Vestroia+
 Barom One* 
 Beautiful Bones: Sakurako's Investigation*
 BB-Daman Bakugaiden V* (a Bomberman anime) 
 BECK: Mongolian Chop Squad* 
 Beet the Vandel Buster Beyblade+
 Beyblade G-Revolution Beyblade V-Force Blood Lad*
 Blue Dragon+
 Bokura ga Ita*
 Buddy Complex*
 Burst Angel*
 Buzzer Beater Captain Earth*
 Captain Kuppa*
 Captain Tsubasa* (2001 version)
 Carried by the Wind: Tsukikage Ran* (as Ran: The Samurai Girl)
 Casshern Sins Cat's Eye Ceres, Celestial Legend* 
 Cheeky Angel Chōsoku Spinner (as Super Yoyo)
 Chrono Crusade*
 Cinderella Boy*
 Claymore*
 Cluster Edge*
 Code-E* and Mission-E*
 Code Geass Combattler V Corrector Yui*
 Cosmo Warrior Zero*
 Cowboy Bebop Cromartie High School*
 Crush Gear Nitro+
 Crush Gear Turbo+
 Cuticle Detective Inaba'*
 Cyborg 009 (2001 version)
 D. C.: Da Capo* (first season only)
 D.Gray-man D.N.Angel Daigunder*
 Daily Lives of High School Boys*
 Daimos+
 Daltanious+
 Dash! Yonkuro*
 Date A Live*
 Dear Boys Death Note*
 Deltora Quest+
 Demon Lord Dante*
 The Devil is a Part-Timer!*
 Devil May Cry: The Animated Series*
 Devil Survivor 2: The Animation*
 D.I.C.E.*
 The Digimon anime franchise:
 Digimon Adventure+
 Digimon Adventure 02+
 Digimon Tamers+
 Digimon Frontier+
 Digimon Data Squad (as Digimon Savers)
 Digimon Xros Wars*
 Dragon Collection* 
 Dragon Crisis!*
 Duel Masters Earth Maiden Arjuna* (as Arjuna)
 The Eccentric Family*
 El Hazard-TV: The Wanderers (The Wanderers)
 Elemental Gerad Element Hunters*
 Eureka Seven* 
 Eyeshield 21 Fabre Sensei wa Meitantei* (Inspector Fabre)
 The Familiar of Zero*
 Fate/kaleid liner Prisma Illya*
 Fate/kaleid liner Prisma Illya 2wei!*
 Fate/kaleid liner Prisma Illya 3rei!*
 Fate/Zero*
 Fighting Beauty Wulong* (Wulong) 
 Folktales from Japan* 
 Fortune Quest L (Fortune Quest)
 Forza! Hidemaru* (Forza! Mario)
 The Fruit of Grisaia*
 The Eden of Grisaia* 
 Free!*
 Free!: Eternal Summer*
 Fruits Basket Full Metal Panic! and Full Metal Panic? Fumoffu Futari wa Pretty Cure* (Pretty Cure; not to be confused with the spin-off franchise)
 Future GPX Cyber Formula* (Cyber Formula GPX)
 GA Geijutsuka Art Design Class*
 Gakuen Utopia Manabi Straight!*
 Galaxy Angel Gankutsuou: The Count of Monte Cristo* (The Count of Monte Cristo)
 Gargantia on the Verdurous Planet*
 Gatchaman Gate Keepers Genki Bakuhatsu Ganbaruger* (as Energy Bomb [Gamburgar])
 Genma Wars* 
 Gensomaden Saiyuki Saiyuki Reload & Saiyuki Reload Gunlock Get Drive! Amdriver* (as Amdriver)
 GetBackers Ghost Hunt*
 Giant Killing*
 Gintama (Season 1 to 5)
 Gintama: Enchousen*
 Godannar*
 Gokudo-kun Manyuki (as Jester, the Adventurer)
 The Good Witch of the West*
 Gourmet Girl Graffiti*
 GR: Giant Robo*
 Grimgar of Fantasy and Ash*
 Gun Frontier*
 .hack//Legend of the Twilight* 
 Hajime no Ippo (as Knock Out; 2000 and 2009 TV series; excluding OVA)
 Haikyū!! Hakkenden: Eight Dogs of the East* 
 Hakuōki*
 Hana Yori Dango Hanasaku Iroha*
 Hani Hani*
 Happiness!*
 Hareluya II BØY* (as Hareluya Boy)
 Harukanaru Toki no Naka de Hachiyō Shō (as Haruka)
 Hatsumei Boy Kanipan and Chou Hatsumei Boy Kanipan (known collectively as Gadget Boy and referred to as one series; not to be confused with Gadget Boy & Heather)
 Heaven's Memo Pad*
 Heroic Age* 
 The Heroic Legend of Arslan*
 Heroman*
 Hetalia: Axis Powers*
 Hetalia: World Series*
 Hetalia: The Beautiful World*
 Hikarian*
 Himouto! Umaru-chan* (as Umaru-chan)
 Hunter × Hunter (1999 TV series; 2002 OVA only)
 I Love Bubu Chacha (BuBu ChaCha)
 Ikkitousen*
 Inazuma Eleven Initial D+
 Initial D: 2nd Stage+
 Initial D: Fourth Stage Initial D: Fifth Stage*
 Innocent Venus*
 InuYasha Ironman 28 
 Ixion Saga DT*
 Izumo: Takeki Tsurugi no Senki* (Izumo)
 Janperson Jibaku-kun* (Bucky the Incredible Kid)
 Jigoku Shoujo*
 Jinki: Extend*
 Kagihime Monogatari Eikyū Alice Rondo* (Eternal Alice)
 Kaiketsu Zorori* (Zorori)
 Kamisama Dolls*
 Karneval*
 Kekkaishi* 
 Keijo!!!!!!!! Hip Whip Girl*
 Kiba Kimba the White Lion* (1989; not to be confused with the 1966 coloured English dub first seen on ABC 5)
 Kishin Dôji Zenki (Zenki)
 Kobato.*
 Koi Koi Seven*
 Kokoro Connect* 
 KonoSuba*
 Kōtetsu Sangokushi*
 His and Her Circumstances (Tales at North Hills High)
 Kurozuka*
 Kyo Kara Maoh!*
 Kyōran Kazoku Nikki*
 Last Exile The Legend of the Legendary Heroes*
 Lemon Angel Project* 
 Leviathan The Last Defense* (as Leviathan)
 Lost Universe 
 Love Hina Lovely Idol* 
 Love Live! Sunshine!!*
 Maburaho*
 Machine Robo Rescue+
 Magic Kaito 1412 Magical Canan*
 Majestic Prince*
 Major*
 Mamotte! Lollipop*
 The Marshmallow Times* (Korean name: Raspberry Times)
 Masked Rider Blade Masked Rider Ryuki Master of Epic Melody of Oblivion*
 Mermaid Forest*
 Metal Fighter Miku Michiko to Hatchin* (as Michiko & Hatchin)
 Mister Ajikko*
 Mirmo Zibang!* (as Mirmo de Pon!)
 Mitsume ga Tōru* (Three-Eyed One)
 Mobile Suit Gundam Mobile Suit Gundam 00 Mobile Suit Gundam AGE+
 Mobile Suit Gundam Seed+ and Gundam Seed Destiny+
 Mon-Colle Knights Monkey Magic+
 Monkey Turn* and Monkey Turn V*
 Monkey Typhoon+
 Monster*
 Monster Rancher Moomin* (Japanese TV version)
 Musashi Gundoh* (as Musashi)
 My Bride Is a Mermaid*
 The Mythical Detective Loki Ragnarok (as Mythical Detective Loki)
 Najica Blitz Tactics*
 Naruto Needless*
 Negima!* (the Xebec version) and Negima!?* (Shaft version, labelled by announcer as "Negima!? Season 2")
 Nekketsu Saikyo Gozaurer* (as Gosaurer)
 NG Knight Lamune and 40* (as Knights of Remune NG) and VS Knight Lamune & 40 Fire* (as Knights of Ramune VS)
 Ninja Boy Rantaro Nobunagun*
 Nogizaka Haruka no Himitsu*
 Offside*
 One Outs*
 One Week Friends*
 Onegai My Melody* (My Melody)
 Orange*
 Oreca Battle*
 Otogi Zoshi*
 Ouran High School Host Club*
 Over Drive*
 Pandora in the Crimson Shell: Ghost Urn*
 Pani Poni Dash*
 Peacemaker Kurogane* (Peacemaker)
 Persona: Trinity Soul*
 Phantom ~Requiem for the Phantom~*
 Popolocrois (second series)
 Power Rangers Series Power Rangers Wild Force Power Rangers Ninja Storm Power Rangers Dino Thunder Power Rangers SPD Power Rangers Mystic Force Power Rangers Operation Overdrive Power Rangers Jungle Fury Power Rangers RPM Power Rangers Samurai Power Rangers Megaforce Power Rangers Dino Charge Prétear Prince of Tennis Princess Resurrection*
 Project ARMS Project Blue Earth SOS* (Project Blue)
 Ragnarok The Animation RahXephon*
 Reborn! Revolutionary Girl Utena* (Ursula's Kiss)
 Rockman EXE and Rockman EXE Axess*
 Rumbling Hearts*
 Rune Soldier Rurouni Kenshin+ (as Samurai X)
 Ryusei Sentai Musumet* (Musumet)
 S · A: Special A (known simply as Special A)
 Sailor Moon (Original, R and S)
 Samurai Deeper Kyo Sasami: Magical Girls Club* (Sasami) 
 Say "I love you".*
 School Rumble* 
 Scrapped Princess SD Gundam Force+ 
 ""Shaider (2006-2009)
 Shaman King
 Shattered Angels* (original name: Kyoshiro and the Eternal Sky)
 Shigofumi: Letters from the Departed*
 Shiki*
 Shin Mazinger Shougeki! Z Hen (Shin Mazinger Edition Z)
 Shinseikiden Mars* (Mars the Terminator)
 Shura no Toki*
 Skull Man*
 Slayers
 Slayers Next
 Slayers Try
 Slayers Revolution*
 Slayers Evolution-R*
 Sorcerer Hunters
 Sorcerer Orphen
 Sorcerer Orphen Revenge
 Soul Eater
 Soul Hunter
 Soul Link*
 Space Brothers*
 Spider Riders*
 Star-Myu: High School Star Musical*
 Starship Operators*
 Street Fighter II V
 Sugar: A Little Snow Fairy
 Sugar Sugar Rune
 Sunny Pig
 Super Doll Licca
 Super Gals
 Susie and Marvy*
 Suzuka*
 Tactics
 Tanaka-kun is Always Listless*
 Taro the Space Alien*
 Tenjho Tenge
 Those Who Hunt Elves
 Tide-Line Blue*
 Tiger & Bunny*
 Toaru Kagaku no Railgun* and Toaru Majutsu no Index*
 Tokyo Magnitude 8.0*
 Tokyo Underground
 Totsugeki! Pappara-tai* (The Xtreme Team)
 Transformers Armada
 Transformers: Cybertron*
 Trigun
 The Twelve Kingdoms
 Ultraviolet: Code 044*
 Utawarerumono*
 Vampire Knight*
 Vandread*
 Viewtiful Joe*
 Voltes V+ (Voltes V Evolution)
 Voltron
 Wandaba Style*
 Weiß Kreuz (Knight Hunters)
 Wind: A Breath of Heart*
 Working!!* (Season 1 and 2)
 Yakitate!! Japan*
 Yamada and the Seven Witches*
 Yoshinaga-san Chi no Gargoyle* (as Gargoyle of Yoshinaga Family)
 Your Lie in April*
 You're Under Arrest* (first season only; excluding OVAs)
 Yowamushi Pedal* (first season only)
 Yu-Gi-Oh! Duel Monsters+
 Yu-Gi-Oh! 5D's
 Yu-Gi-Oh! GX*
 Yu-Gi-Oh! Zexal
 Yuki Yuna is a Hero*
 Yumeiro Patissiere*
 Yuyushiki*
 Zatch Bell!* (as Gash Bell!) (first season only)
 Zettai Karen Children* (as Absolutely Lovely Children)
 Zettai Muteki Raijin-Oh+ (Raijin-Oh)
 Zoids Genesis*

References

External links

Hero
Hero